Mihai Chițac (November 4, 1928 – November 1, 2010) was a Romanian general and Interior Minister from 1989 to 1990 during the waning days of the Communist era. In 2008, Chițac and another general, Victor Stănculescu, were convicted of aggravated manslaughter by the Supreme Court for the shooting deaths of pro-democracy protesters during the Romanian Revolution of 1989.

Communist Romanian security forces fired live ammunition at protesters and civilians between December 17 and 20, 1989, killing 72 civilians and injuring 253 others. Generals Chițac and Stănculescu were originally convicted and sentenced for multiple aggravated murder charges during a 1999 trial. The trial had found both guilty of ordering troops and security forces to shoot pro-democracy and anti-communist protesters in Timișoara. Chițac's prison terms were discontinued on six occasions due to deteriorating health.

The Romanian Supreme Court further sentenced Chițac and Stănculescu to fifteen years in prison for aggravated manslaughter on October 16, 2008.

Chiţac was admitted to Bucharest Military Hospital on September 19, 2010, for cardiac problems and tumors discovered that same month. He died at his home in Bucharest at 10 a.m. on November 1, 2010, 3 days before his 82nd birthday.  He is buried at Ghencea Cemetery.

1928 births
2010 deaths
Romanian generals
Romanian Ministers of Interior
People of the Romanian Revolution
Military personnel from Bucharest
Romanian people convicted of manslaughter
Burials at Ghencea Cemetery
People from Botoșani County